Wendy Seltzer is an American attorney and a staff member at the World Wide Web Consortium, where she is the chair of the Improving Web Advertising Business Group. She was previously with Princeton's Center for Information Technology Policy. Seltzer is also a Fellow with Harvard's Berkman Center for Internet & Society, where she founded and leads the Lumen clearinghouse, which is aimed at helping Internet users to understand their rights in response to cease-and-desist threats related to intellectual property and other legal demands.

Seltzer sits on the board of directors of the World Wide Web Foundation. A former At-large Liaison to the ICANN board of directors, she has advocated for increased transparency of the organization of, and for increased protection of, the privacy of Internet users. From April to July 2007, she was a Visiting Fellow at the Oxford Internet Institute.

Previously, she was a visiting assistant professor at the Northeastern University School of Law and Brooklyn Law School, and a fellow at the Information Society Project at Yale Law School, and served on the board of directors of the Tor Project. Before that, she was a staff attorney with the Electronic Frontier Foundation, specializing in intellectual property and free speech issues.

Seltzer has an A.B. from Harvard College and a J.D. from Harvard Law School. She is also a Perl programmer.

Publications
 "EFF Members Build Liberated TVs." Deeplinks (May 23, 2005). Electronic Frontier Foundation.

References

External links

 Official website
 Profile at Berkman Center for Internet & Society | Harvard University
 Profile at Node.js Interactive
 Speaking session: 11:20am, December 12, 2019.
 Profile at Oxford Internet Institute
 Wendy Seltzer's blog
 Papers by Wendy Seltzer at SSRN
 Digital TV Liberation Front — Broadcast Flag at Electronic Frontier Foundation
 Fulbright Chair Speaker Series (MP3)

Living people
Year of birth missing (living people)
American women academics
American bloggers
American women lawyers
Berkman Fellows
Copyright activists
Copyright scholars
Privacy activists
First Amendment scholars
Harvard College alumni
Harvard Law School alumni
Open content activists
Yale Information Society Project Fellows
American women bloggers
American women legal scholars
Brooklyn Law School faculty
Yale Law School faculty
21st-century American women